Györgyi Zsivoczky-Farkas (née Farkas; born 13 February 1985 in Budapest, Hungary) is a Hungarian heptathlete.

Career
Her personal best score is 6389 achieved at Beijing on 23 August 2015.

She finished 28th in the 2008 Summer Olympics at Beijing with a score of 5760. Farkas finished 7th in the 10th IAAF World Junior Championships in Grosseto, Italy in July, 2004, with a score of 5550.  At the 2012 Summer Olympics in London, she finished in 21st place, with a score of 6013.

She is married to another Hungarian combined events specialist, Attila Zsivoczky.

Achievements

References 

 IAAF profile for Györgyi Farkas

External links 
 
 
 
 
 

1985 births
Living people
Hungarian heptathletes
Athletes (track and field) at the 2008 Summer Olympics
Athletes (track and field) at the 2012 Summer Olympics
Athletes (track and field) at the 2016 Summer Olympics
Olympic athletes of Hungary
Athletes from Budapest
World Athletics Championships athletes for Hungary
Universiade medalists in athletics (track and field)
Universiade silver medalists for Hungary
Hungarian Athletics Championships winners